Jack Garden (3 March 1895 – 1 December 1955) was an Australian rules footballer who played with Essendon in the VFL.

A wingman, Garden debuted for Essendon in 1915 but did not play again until 1920 due to war service. He won the Essendon Best and Fairest award in his first year back and the following season made his first appearance for Victoria. Garden won back-to-back premierships in 1923 and 1924.

External links

Profile at Essendonfc.com.au

1895 births
Australian rules footballers from Victoria (Australia)
Essendon Football Club players
Essendon Football Club Premiership players
Crichton Medal winners
Kew Football Club players
1955 deaths
Two-time VFL/AFL Premiership players